Johannes Pinsk (4 February 1891 in Szczecin – 21 May 1957 in Berlin-Dahlem) was a German Catholic theologian and professor.

Pinsk studied theology in Breslau and was ordained priest 13th Juni 1915. 1923 he has got his doctorate in theology.

1928 he moved to Berlin, where he was busy in the area of pastoral care and spiritual guidance of academics. From 1939 to 1954 he led the parish Mater Dolorosa in Berlin-Lankwitz. After that he became professor at the Free University of Berlin. He wrote hundreds of articles, and several dozen books.

He died during a wedding in Berlin-Dahlem in 1957 by a heart attack.

20th-century German Catholic theologians
Writers from Berlin
Writers from Szczecin
Academic staff of the Free University of Berlin
1891 births
1957 deaths
People from the Province of Pomerania
German male non-fiction writers
Clergy from Szczecin
20th-century pseudonymous writers